Urbach may refer to:

Places
Urbach, Baden-Württemberg, Germany
Urbach, Rhineland-Palatinate, Germany
Urbach, Thuringia, German
Urbach, village in Moselle, France, which is the burial site of J. F. Oberlin
Urbach, a valley in Oberhasli, Switzerland

People with the surname
 Eithan Urbach (born 1977), Israeli backstroke swimmer who competed in the 1996 and 2000 Summer Olympic Games
 Ephraim Urbach (191291), Israeli author and scholar of Judaism
Erich Urbach (18931946), Austrian dermatologist
 Hinko Urbach (18721960), Czech-born rabbi who relocated to Yugoslavia
Karina Urbach, German historian
Nafa Urbach (born 1980), Indonesian singer, actress and model
 Peter Urbach (19402011), German intelligence informant and agent provocateur

See also
Urbach–Wiethe disease, a rare recessive genetic disorder, named after Erich Urbach and Camillo Wiethe